The Achelous ( Akhelôios), also Acheloos, is a mountain torrent of ancient Arcadia, flowing into the Alpheus, from the north of Mount Lycaeus.

References

Rivers of Greece
Geography of ancient Arcadia